Anthony Jones (also known as "Sooty" Jones) was an American rock bassist.  He played bass guitar for the British band Humble Pie, when Steve Marriott reformed the group in April 1980. Jones is credited on the Humble Pie albums On to Victory released by Atco in 1980, and Go for the Throat also released by Atco the following year.

Bibliography
Paolo Hewitt John Hellier (2004). Steve Marriott - All Too Beautiful....  Helter Skelter Publishing

References

1949 births
1985 deaths
American rock bass guitarists
American male bass guitarists
Humble Pie (band) members
20th-century American musicians
20th-century British musicians
American male guitarists
20th-century American guitarists
20th-century bass guitarists
20th-century American male musicians